William Anthony Parker Jr. (born 17 May 1982) is a French-American former professional basketball player and majority owner of ASVEL Basket in the LNB Pro A. Himself the son of a basketball pro, Parker started his career at Paris Basket Racing in the French basketball league before joining the San Antonio Spurs of the National Basketball Association (NBA). He was selected by the Spurs with the 28th overall pick in the 2001 NBA draft, and quickly became their starting point guard. Parker won four NBA championships (2003, 2005, 2007, and 2014), all of which were with the Spurs. He also played for ASVEL Basket in France during the 2011 NBA lockout, and finished his playing career after one season with the Charlotte Hornets. He retired as the ninth leading scorer and fifth leading passer in NBA playoffs history.

Parker was named to six NBA All-Star games, three All-NBA Second Teams, an All-NBA Third Team and was named MVP of the 2007 NBA Finals. He was also a member of the All-Rookie First Team and had his No. 9 retired by the Spurs. He is regarded as one of the greatest European players of all time.

While playing with the French national team, Parker was named the MVP of EuroBasket 2013, following his team's victory over Lithuania in the final. He finished as the tournament's top scorer, with an average of 19 points per game. In 2015, he became the all-time leading scorer in the EuroBasket competition, a record that was broken by Pau Gasol two years later.

Early life 

Parker was born in Bruges, Belgium, and raised in France. His father, Tony Parker Sr., an African American, played basketball at Loyola University Chicago as well as professionally overseas. His mother, Pamela Firestone, is Dutch. His maternal grandmother, Jetty Baars-Wienese, is Dutch national tennis champion (1956), whose brother and Tony's great-uncle Jan Wienese is an Olympic gold medalist in rowing. Parker enjoyed close relationships with his brothers, and they would often attend their father's basketball games together. At first, Parker was more interested in soccer, but after watching the evolution of Michael Jordan into a global basketball superstar during summer trips to his father's native city of Chicago, he changed his mind. Parker's two younger brothers were also heavily involved in basketball; T. J. and Pierre would go on to play basketball at college and professional levels. As Parker built his skill, he played the point guard position, recognizing that his speed and agility made this position ideal for him. At age 15, he became a naturalized French citizen while retaining his American nationality. He was eventually asked to attend the INSEP in Paris.

Professional career

Paris Basket Racing (1999–2001) 

After playing in the French amateur leagues for two seasons, Parker turned professional and signed with Paris Basket Racing in 1999. In the summer of 2000, Parker was invited to the Nike Hoop Summit in Indianapolis. In a contest between the American and European All-Stars, Parker recorded 20 points, seven assists, four rebounds and two steals. His performance prompted a recruiting war among several colleges, including UCLA and Georgia Tech. Parker decided to forgo the NCAA and to remain in France; he spent the next year with Paris Basket Racing in the French League before entering the 2001 NBA draft.

San Antonio Spurs (2001–2011)

First championship (2001–2003) 

Before the 2001 NBA draft, Parker was invited to the San Antonio Spurs' summer camp. Coach Gregg Popovich had him play against Spurs scout and ex-NBA player Lance Blanks. Parker was overwhelmed by Blanks's tough and physical defense, and Popovich was ready to send him away after just 10 minutes. But after seeing a "best of" mix tape of Parker's best plays, Popovich decided to invite Parker a second time. This time, Parker made a better impression against Blanks; the Frenchman later described Blanks as a "one-man wrecking crew". But while Popovich decided that Parker was worth the gamble, the Spurs still had to hope that other teams would not pick Parker during the draft. Parker's name was barely mentioned in the pre-draft predictions, and the point guard was drafted 28th overall by the Spurs on draft day.

After initially playing backup to Antonio Daniels, Parker became a starter and made 77 regular-season appearances in his rookie season, averaging 9.2 points, 4.3 assists and 2.6 rebounds in 29.4 minutes per game. When he played against the Los Angeles Clippers on 30 November 2001, he became the third French player to play in an NBA game, after Tariq Abdul-Wahad and Jérôme Moïso. By the end of the season, the rookie led San Antonio in assists and steals, and was named to the All-Rookie First Team for 2001–02, becoming the first foreign-born guard to earn the honor.

In 2002–03, Parker played in all 82 regular-season games as San Antonio's starting point guard on a team that was largely revamped from previous years. He improved his regular season statistics, averaging 15.5 points per game (ppg), 5.3 assists per game (apg) and 2.6 rebounds per game (rpg). Parker's role as the team's playmaker was reflected in his leading the team in assists on 49 occasions. During the 2003 NBA All-Star Weekend, Parker represented the Sophomores in the Rookie Challenge, and also participated in the inaugural Skills Challenge. In the post season, the Spurs, led by Tim Duncan, defeated the New Jersey Nets 4–2 in the finals, and Parker earned his first NBA championship ring. Despite the victory, Parker struggled with inconsistent play throughout the playoffs, and was often benched in favor of more experienced guards Steve Kerr and Speedy Claxton late in the games.

Second championship (2003–2005) 

Despite winning a championship with the Spurs, doubts lingered over Parker's future. The Spurs had attempted and failed to acquire New Jersey Nets' Jason Kidd, but Parker told coach Popovich that he wanted to be San Antonio's starting point guard. Parker played well during the regular season, recording 14.7 ppg, 5.5 apg and 3.2 rpg. However, the Spurs were defeated by the Los Angeles Lakers in the Western Conference semi-finals in the 2004 NBA Playoffs, and were denied back-to-back titles.

During the 2004–05 season, Parker recorded improved regular season statistics, tallying 16.6 ppg, 6.1 apg and a career-high 3.7 rpg. He was also ranked 13th in the league in total assists, and was third among point guards in field goal percentage. The Spurs were strong in the playoffs, and Parker was instrumental in the victories over the Denver Nuggets, Seattle SuperSonics and Phoenix Suns. However, Parker struggled in the Finals series against the Detroit Pistons. Spurs colleagues Manu Ginóbili and Brent Barry often took over playmaking duties as Parker was unable to perform as well as he did in the regular season. Nevertheless, the Spurs won their third-ever NBA championship by defeating the defending champions 4–3 in the 2005 NBA Finals.

Third championship (2005–2007) 

Parker was selected for the first time in his career an NBA All-Star for the 2005–06 season as he managed 18.9 ppg and an impressive .548 in field goal percentage. Parker's scoring average was even higher than Duncan's, and his form propelled the Spurs to a 63–19 win–loss record and qualification for the 2006 NBA Playoffs. However, the top-seeded Spurs were again unable to win back-to-back titles as they were eliminated in the second round by the Dallas Mavericks.

On 14 February 2007, after delivering consistent numbers in the first half of the 2006–07 season, Parker was selected to play in the 2007 NBA All-Star Game as a reserve guard. With Parker operating as the starting point guard in the 2006–07 season, the Spurs qualified for the 2007 NBA Playoffs and finished second in the Southwest Division. In the Western Conference Semifinals, the Spurs met the Phoenix Suns led by two-time and reigning NBA MVP Steve Nash. After eliminating the Suns, the Spurs defeated the Utah Jazz 4–1 to win the Western Conference Finals. Parker and the Spurs went on to face the Cleveland Cavaliers and swept them 4–0 to win the 2007 NBA Finals. In this series, Parker consistently outplayed his Cavaliers counterparts Daniel Gibson and All-Defensive Team member Larry Hughes and scored a series-high 24.5 points, accompanied by a high field goal percentage of 56.8% and of 57.1% from three-point range. For his performances, he was named the 2007 NBA Finals MVP, becoming the first European-born player to receive the award.

Falling short and injury (2007–2011) 

In the 2007–08 regular season, Parker recorded similar averages as the previous two seasons for points and rebounds, and slightly increased his assists per game average. The Spurs finished third in the Western Conference and faced the Phoenix Suns in the first round of the 2008 NBA Playoffs. For the third time in four years, San Antonio prevailed over Phoenix; Parker had an outstanding first-round series, averaging nearly 30 points and 7 assists a game. In the next round against Chris Paul's New Orleans Hornets, the Spurs dropped the first two road games before responding with a strong win in the third game. In that game, Parker recorded a double-double with 31 points and 11 assists. The experienced Spurs took seven games to defeat the Hornets, but were unable to get past the Los Angeles Lakers in the Conference Finals, and the Spurs once again failed to win back-to-back NBA championships.

San Antonio got off to a rocky start in their 2008–09 NBA season, losing the first three contests. In their fourth game against the Minnesota Timberwolves, however, Parker scored a career-high 55 points to lead the Spurs to their first victory of the campaign. The Spurs recovered soon enough, and approached the All-Star break ranked second in the Conference. With Parker averaging a career-high in points per game, he was named as a reserve for the 2009 All-Star game. The Spurs were without influential shooting guard Ginóbili for much for the season, and greater responsibility fell on Parker's shoulders. He helped lead the team to a 54–28 record and the third seed for the playoffs, In Game 4 of the first round against Dallas, Parker matched George Gervin's franchise playoff record for points in a half with 31. However, the Spurs eventually lost 4–1, bowing out of the playoffs in the first round for the first time since 2000. Parker's 28.6 points and 4.2 rebounds per game broke his previous playoffs career-best averages of 22.4 points and 3.7 rebounds. On 13 May 2009, he was named to the All-NBA Third Team.

With the Spurs looking to provide a more solid supporting cast in the 2009–10 season, they acquired Richard Jefferson, Theo Ratliff, Antonio McDyess, DeJuan Blair, and Keith Bogans.
Parker injured his hand during the season and missed 26 games. The Spurs qualified for the playoffs as the seventh seed, and defeated Dallas 4–2 in the first round, only to lose 4–0 to Phoenix in the next round.

In the 2010–11 season, the Spurs compiled a 12-game winning streak to go 13–2 after 15 games. The Spurs were 29–4 after 33 games—one of the ten best starts in NBA history–and led the league at 35–6 halfway through the season. Parker and the Spurs ended the regular season as the first seed in the West for the 2011 NBA playoffs, and were second in the league (to Chicago). Despite finishing with a 61–21 record, however, the Spurs could not avoid being upset in the first round, 4–2, by the eighth-seeded Memphis Grizzlies.

ASVEL (2011) 

During the 2011 NBA lockout, Parker signed with ASVEL, the French basketball team in which he owns a stake. Parker's salary was about $2,000 a month. He was quoted as saying, "I'll be playing nearly for free." He also paid his own insurance, which reportedly cost $250,000 for three months.

Return to San Antonio (2011–2018)

Best record in the NBA and finals upsets (2011–2013) 

During the 2011–12 NBA season, Parker helped the Spurs reach the best record in the West for the second straight season; the team tied the Chicago Bulls for the best overall record in the league. On 4 February 2012, Parker became the all-time assist leader of the franchise with 4,477, surpassing Avery Johnson, adding 42 points in a victory against Oklahoma City Thunder. The Spurs secured their 13th straight 50 win season despite the lockout (a new NBA record), and Parker received his fourth All-Star nod. He finished fifth in MVP award voting, receiving four first-place votes. Late in the season, the Spurs signed Parker's longtime friend Boris Diaw, who was claimed off waivers from the Charlotte Bobcats. In the 2012 NBA Playoffs, Parker averaged 20.1 points and 6.8 assists as the Spurs swept through the first two rounds, defeating the Utah Jazz and the Los Angeles Clippers. In the Western Conference Finals the Spurs faced the young Oklahoma City Thunder. After winning Game 1 and Game 2, 101–98 and 120–111 respectively, and taking a 2–0 series lead, the Spurs lost four consecutive games, thus losing the series 4–2.

In their second game of the 2012–13 season, the Spurs faced the Thunder in a rematch of the previous Western Conference Finals, and Parker hit a game-winner to secure a win for the Spurs. On 10 December 2012, Parker got his first career triple-double after 825 regular-season games against the Houston Rockets in overtime with 27 points, 12 rebounds, and 12 assists. He was the 4th player in NBA history to have gone 800 games or more into their career before their first triple-double, joining Karl Malone (860), Patrick Ewing (834), and Cedric Maxwell (824). Parker was named Western Conference Player of the Month for the month of January 2013 for leading the Spurs to a 12–3 record, and the best record in the NBA. He averaged 21.9 points per game and 7.9 assists per game that month while shooting 56.3% from the field. He became the first Spurs player to receive the honor since Tim Duncan in April 2002. On 21 May 2013, Parker recorded a career-high 18 assists to go with 15 points in the Spurs' Western Conference finals game 2 victory over the Memphis Grizzlies.

In game 1 of the 2013 NBA Finals against the defending champion Miami Heat, Parker hit a clutch jump shot off the glass with 5.2 seconds remaining in the game, securing a 92–88 victory for San Antonio. The Spurs eventually lost the series in seven games.

Fourth championship (2013–2014) 

In May 2014, Parker, alongside Manu Ginóbili and Tim Duncan, tied the record for most wins in playoffs history by a trio of players playing together; the record was previously held by the LA Lakers trio of Magic Johnson, Kareem Abdul-Jabbar and Michael Cooper at 110 wins. The Spurs went on to beat the Thunder in six games and advance to the NBA Finals for the second straight year. San Antonio would once again face the Miami Heat and would win the 2014 NBA Finals in five games. This victory gave Parker his fourth championship and the fifth championship to the Spurs.

Final years with Spurs (2014–2018) 

On 1 August 2014, Parker signed a three-year, $43.3 million contract extension with the Spurs. The Spurs finished the 2014–15 season with a 55–27 record, but lost in the first round of the playoffs to the Los Angeles Clippers in seven games. Parker struggled in the playoffs due to injury and averaged 10.9 points a game on 36% shooting.

In the 2015–16 season, Parker helped the Spurs win a franchise-best 67 games while averaging 11.9 points per game. In the 2016 playoffs, the Spurs swept the Memphis Grizzlies in the first round, but were eliminated in the second round by the Oklahoma City Thunder in six games.

Heading into the 2016–17 season, Parker lost longtime teammate Tim Duncan to retirement. The Spurs finished the season with a 61–21 record, as they registered back-to-back 60-win seasons for the first time in franchise history. Parker played 63 games and averaged 10.1 points per game. In the 2017 playoffs, the Spurs were once again matched with the Memphis Grizzlies in the first round. San Antonio again defeated Memphis 4–2, with Parker averaging 16.3 points per game in the series. After scoring 18 points in Game 2 of the second round, a win against the Houston Rockets, Parker left the game with a rupture of his left quadriceps tendon that ended his season.<ref>Breaking News: Parker Ruptures Left Quadriceps Tendon, National Basketball Association, 4 May 2017. Retrieved 5 May 2017.</ref> Game 3 of the series marked San Antonio's first postseason game without Parker since 2001, which ended an NBA record of 221 straight playoff appearances for Parker. The injury required surgery and led some to speculate Parker could miss significant time, if he came back at all.

On 27 November 2017, in a 115–108 win over the Dallas Mavericks, Parker had six points and four assists in 14 minutes in his first appearance since tearing his quadriceps tendon. On 29 November, Parker had 10 points and five assists while playing 18 minutes in his second game back. In his last season with the Spurs, Parker played 55 games and averaged a career-low 7.7 points a game. The Spurs made it to the playoffs and lost to the Golden State Warriors in 5 games in the first round.

On 11 November 2019, the Spurs retired Parker's No. 9 jersey.

 Charlotte Hornets (2018–2019) 

On 23 July 2018, Parker signed a two-year contract with the Charlotte Hornets. He made his debut as a Hornets player on 17 October 2018, recording 8 points on 4/8 shooting, 7 assists, and 3 rebounds while coming off of the bench in 19 minutes of action in a 113–112 loss to the Milwaukee Bucks.

On 10 June 2019, Parker announced his retirement from the NBA. He ended his career ranked fifth in career playoff assists (1,143) and ninth in career playoff scoring (4,045).

 National team career 

Parker played for France's Junior National Teams at the 1997 FIBA Europe Under-16 Championship, both the 1998 FIBA Europe Under-18 Championship and the 2000 FIBA Europe Under-18 Championship, and the 2002 FIBA Europe Under-20 Championship. He was elected the Most Valuable Player of the 2000 FIBA Europe Under-18 Championship, when France captured the gold medal, as he averaged 14.4 points and 2.5 assists per game. Parker averaged 25.8 points, 6.8 assists, and 6.8 steals per game at the 2002 FIBA Europe Under-20 Championship. With the French senior national team, Parker has played in the 2001, 2003, 2005, 2007, 2009, 2011 and 2013 FIBA EuroBaskets.

France won the bronze medal in the 2005 FIBA EuroBasket, by defeating the Spanish national team 98–68 in the bronze medal game. As the captain of the French national team since 2003, Parker was slated to lead France at the 2006 FIBA World Championship, but he was unable to play after breaking a finger when he caught his hand in the jersey of a Brazilian national team player in France's final warm-up for the tournament. During the EuroBasket 2007, Parker averaged 20.1 points per game and 2.8 assists per game in nine tournament games, but France was defeated in the quarter-finals by the Russian national team. He passed the 2010 FIBA World Championship to recover fully from some injuries he had during the 2009–10 NBA season. Parker returned to the team in 2011, and France reached the finals of the 2011 EuroBasket, losing to Spain. Parker also joined the team for the 2012 Summer Olympics in London. In 2013, Parker and the French national team won the 2013 FIBA EuroBasket tournament.

While playing for France in EuroBasket 2015, in a group game against Poland, Parker scored his 1,032nd career point in the tournament, and in doing so, he overtook Nikos Galis as the all-time leading scorer in the history of the EuroBasket competition. That record was later broken by Pau Gasol.

During the Olympic Qualifying Tournament in Manila, Philippines, in July 2016, Parker announced his intention to retire from international competition, but not the NBA, after the 2016 Summer Olympics. He reiterated that intent after France lost in the quarter-finals in Rio de Janeiro.An era of world basketball ends, Parker, Ginobili retire, USA Today, Jeff Zillgitt, 19 August 2016. Retrieved 21 August 2016.

 Player profile 

Standing at 6 feet 2 inches tall (1.88 m) and weighing 185 pounds (84 kg), Parker played at the point guard position and established himself as a potent offensive player. He was voted by his peers in a 2007 poll, as one of the quickest players in the NBA, and he often slashed to the basket for a layup or teardrop shot. Despite his relatively small size for a basketball player, he led the league in "points in the paint" for a large portion of the 2005–06 season.

In the initial part of his NBA career, Parker was still considered an erratic shooter off the ball and during the 2005 off-season, Coach Popovich decided to work on that aspect of his play. Spurs shooting coach Chip Engelland forbade Parker to shoot any three-point shots, and among others, corrected his shooting motion and his thumb position. As a result, by the 2006–07 season, Parker had reduced his three-point shot attempts by 117, while shooting 147 more normal field goal attempts compared to 2005, and his accuracy rose by 4% (field goals and three-point shots). He was also able to connect on 78% of his free throws that season. Parker developed tendinitis in his knees early in his career.

 Honors 

 Team honors
 NBA champion: 2003, 2005, 2007, 2014
 Individual honors
 NBA Finals MVP: 2007
 NBA All-Star: 2006, 2007, 2009, 2012, 2013, 2014
 All-NBA Second Team: 2012, 2013, 2014
 All-NBA Third Team: 2009
 NBA All-Rookie First Team: 2002
 NBA Skills Challenge champion: 
 All-time leader in assists for San Antonio
 Member of the 2006 San Antonio All-Star Shooting Stars team. He sealed the victory by making the half-court shot on his first attempt, setting an All-Star Shooting Star record time of 25.1 seconds. He was joined on the team by retired Spur Steve Kerr, and Kendra Wecker from the San Antonio Silver Stars of the WNBA.
 NBA Western Conference Player of the Month for the month of January 2013; first Spurs player to receive the honor since Tim Duncan in April 2002.

 Junior national team
 2000 FIBA Europe Under-18 Championship  and MVP
 Senior national team
 EuroBasket 2013 , MVP and Top Scorer
 EuroBasket 2011  and Top Scorer
 EuroBasket 2005 
 EuroBasket 2015 
 Other honors
 L'Équipe Champion of Champions: 2003, 2013
 Inducted into the Legion of Honor with the rank of Chevalier: 2007
 Euroscar: 2007, 2013
 All-Europeans Player of the Year: 2013, 2014
 FIBA Europe Player of the Year Award: 2013, 2014
 On the cover of NBA Live 09

 Career statistics 

 NBA 

 Regular season 

|-
| style="text-align:left;"|
| style="text-align:left;"|San Antonio
| 77 || 72 || 29.4 || .419 || .323 || .675 || 2.6 || 4.3 || 1.2 || .1 || 9.2
|-
| style="text-align:left; background:#afe6ba;"|†
| style="text-align:left;"|San Antonio
| 82 || style="background:#cfecec;"|82* || 33.8 || .464 || .337 || .755 || 2.6 || 5.3 || .9 || .1 || 15.5
|-
| style="text-align:left;"|
| style="text-align:left;"|San Antonio
| 75 || 75 || 34.4 || .447 || .312 || .702 || 3.2 || 5.5 || .8 || .0 || 14.7
|-
| style="text-align:left; background:#afe6ba;"|†
| style="text-align:left;"|San Antonio
| 80 || 80 || 34.2 || .482 || .276 || .650 || 3.7 || 6.1 || 1.2 || .1 || 16.6
|-
| style="text-align:left;"|
| style="text-align:left;"|San Antonio
| 80 || 80 || 33.9 || .548 || .306 || .707 || 3.3 || 5.8 || 1.0 || .1 || 18.9
|-
| style="text-align:left; background:#afe6ba;"|†
| style="text-align:left;"|San Antonio
| 77 || 77 || 32.5 || .520 || .395 || .783 || 3.2 || 5.5 || 1.1 || .1 || 18.6
|-
| style="text-align:left;"|
| style="text-align:left;"|San Antonio
| 69 || 68 || 33.5 || .494 || .258 || .715 || 3.2 || 6.0 || .8 || .1 || 18.8
|-
| style="text-align:left;"|
| style="text-align:left;"|San Antonio
| 72 || 71 || 34.1 || .506 || .292 || .782 || 3.1 || 6.9 || .9 || .1 || 22.0
|-
| style="text-align:left;"|
| style="text-align:left;"|San Antonio
| 56 || 50 || 30.9 || .487 || .294 || .756 || 2.4 || 5.7 || .5 || .1 || 16.0
|-
| style="text-align:left;"|
| style="text-align:left;"|San Antonio
| 78 || 78 || 32.4 || .519 || .357 || .769 || 3.1 || 6.6 || 1.2 || .0 || 17.5
|-
| style="text-align:left;"|
| style="text-align:left;"|San Antonio
| 60 || 60 || 32.0 || .480 || .230 || .799 || 2.9 || 7.7 || 1.0 || .1 || 18.3
|-
| style="text-align:left;"|
| style="text-align:left;"|San Antonio
| 66 || 66 || 32.9 || .522 || .353 || .845 || 3.0 || 7.6 || .8 || .1 || 20.3
|-
| style="text-align:left; background:#afe6ba;"|†
| style="text-align:left;"|San Antonio
| 68 || 68 || 29.4 || .499 || .373 || .811 || 2.3 || 5.7 || .5 || .1 || 16.7
|-
| style="text-align:left;"|
| style="text-align:left;"|San Antonio
| 68 || 68 || 28.7 || .486 || .427 || .783 || 1.9 || 4.9 || .6 || .0 || 14.4
|-
| style="text-align:left;"|
| style="text-align:left;"|San Antonio
| 72 || 72 || 27.5 || .493 || .415 || .760 || 2.4 || 5.3 || .8 || .2 || 11.9
|-
| style="text-align:left;"|
| style="text-align:left;"|San Antonio
| 63 || 63 || 25.2 || .466 || .333 || .726 || 1.8 || 4.5 || .5 || .0 || 10.1
|-
| style="text-align:left;"|
| style="text-align:left;"|San Antonio
| 55 || 21 || 19.5 || .459 || .270 || .705 || 1.7 || 3.5 || .5 || .0 || 7.7
|-
| style="text-align:left;"|
| style="text-align:left;"|Charlotte
| 56 || 0 || 17.9 || .460 || .255 || .734 || 1.5 || 3.7 || .4 || .1 || 9.5
|- class="sortbottom"
| style="text-align:center;" colspan="2"|Career
| 1,254 || 1,151 || 30.5 || .491 || .324 || .751 || 2.7 || 5.6 || .8 || .1 || 15.5
|- class="sortbottom"
| style="text-align:center;" colspan="2"|All-Star
| 6 || 0 || 18.3 || .522 || .167 || 1.000 || 1.8 || 4.7 || .8 || .1 || 8.8

 Playoffs 

|-
| style="text-align:left;"|2002
| style="text-align:left;"|San Antonio
| 10 || 10 || 34.1 || .456 || .370 || .750 || 2.9 || 4.0 || .9 || .1 || 15.5
|-
| style="text-align:left; background:#afe6ba;"|2003†
| style="text-align:left;"|San Antonio
| 24 || 24 || 33.9 || .403 || .268 || .713 || 2.8 || 3.5 || .9 || .1 || 14.7
|-
| style="text-align:left;"|2004
| style="text-align:left;"|San Antonio
| 10 || 10 || 38.6 || .429 || .395 || .657 || 2.1 || 7.0 || 1.3 || .1 || 18.4
|-
| style="text-align:left; background:#afe6ba;"|2005†
| style="text-align:left;"|San Antonio
| 23 || 23 || 37.3 || .454 || .188 || .632 || 2.9 || 4.3 || .7 || .1 || 17.2
|-
| style="text-align:left;"|2006
| style="text-align:left;"|San Antonio
| 13 || 13 || 36.5 || .460 || .222 || .810 || 3.6 || 3.8 || 1.0 || .1 || 21.1
|-
| style="text-align:left; background:#afe6ba;"|2007†
| style="text-align:left;"|San Antonio
| 20 || 20 || 37.6 || .480 || .333 || .679 || 3.4 || 5.8 || 1.1 || .0 || 20.8
|-
| style="text-align:left;"|2008
| style="text-align:left;"|San Antonio
| 17 || 17 || 38.5 || .497 || .350 || .753 || 3.7 || 6.1 || .9 || .1 || 22.4
|-
| style="text-align:left;"|2009
| style="text-align:left;"|San Antonio
| 5 || 5 || 36.2 || .546 || .214 || .710 || 4.2 || 6.8 || 1.2 || .2 || 28.6
|-
| style="text-align:left;"|2010
| style="text-align:left;"|San Antonio
| 10 || 2 || 33.5 || .474 || .667 || .595 || 3.8 || 5.4 || .6 || .0 || 17.3
|-
| style="text-align:left;"|2011
| style="text-align:left;"|San Antonio
| 6 || 6 || 36.8 || .462 || .125 || .756 || 2.7 || 5.2 || 1.3 || .3 || 19.7
|-
| style="text-align:left;"|2012
| style="text-align:left;"|San Antonio
| 14 || 14 || 36.1 || .453 || .333 || .807 || 3.6 || 6.8 || .9 || .0 || 20.1
|-
| style="text-align:left;"|2013
| style="text-align:left;"|San Antonio
| 21 || 21 || 36.4 || .458 || .355 || .777 || 3.2 || 7.0 || 1.1 || .1 || 20.6
|-
| style="text-align:left; background:#afe6ba;"|2014†
| style="text-align:left;"|San Antonio
| 23 || 23 || 31.3 || .486 || .371 || .729 || 2.0 || 4.8 || .7 || .0 || 17.4
|-
| style="text-align:left;"|2015
| style="text-align:left;"|San Antonio
| 7 || 7 || 30.0 || .363 || .000 || .588 || 3.3 || 3.6 || .3 || .0 || 10.9
|-
| style="text-align:left;"|2016
| style="text-align:left;"|San Antonio
| 10 || 10 || 26.4 || .449 || .250 || .857 || 2.2 || 5.3 || .6 || .2 || 10.4
|-
| style="text-align:left;"|2017
| style="text-align:left;"|San Antonio
| 8 || 8 || 26.4 || .526 || .579 || 1.000 || 2.5 || 3.1 || .5 || .0 || 15.9
|-
| style="text-align:left;"|2018
| style="text-align:left;"|San Antonio
| 5 || 0 || 13.4 || .378 || .000 || .714 || .8 || 1.2 || .4 || .0 || 6.6
|-
| style="text-align:center;" colspan="2"|Career
| 226 || 213 || 34.3 || .461 || .309 || .731 || 2.9 || 5.1 || .9 || .1 || 17.9

 Off the court 

 ASVEL 

In 2009, Parker bought a 20 percent stake in the French basketball club ASVEL, located in Lyon, and held the ceremonial title of Vice President of Basketball Operations. During the 2011 NBA lockout, Parker signed to play for ASVEL, for the French League's minimum wage, until the lockout ended. In 2014, Parker became the majority shareholder of the club, and is now the president of the team.

In September 2015, Parker announced the launch of his own basketball academy in the city of Lyon. On 12 July 2016, he and his business partners published the plans for the construction of a new arena in Villeurbanne, which will become ASVEL's new home court.

 ASVEL Féminin 

In March 2017, it was announced that Parker had become the majority shareholder of Lyon Basket Féminine, a member of the French women's basketball league now known as ASVEL Féminin, and that he would also take over as chairman of the club at the conclusion of the fiscal year 2016–17.

 Family life 

Parker met actress Eva Longoria in November 2004. In August 2005, Longoria confirmed she and Parker were dating, and on 30 November 2006, the couple became engaged. Longoria, a Texas native from nearby Corpus Christi, was a courtside regular at Spurs home games. Parker was quoted during the 2007 NBA All-Star Game saying that, "Eva is doing everything, I'm just going to show up and say yes." They were married in a civil service on 6 July 2007, at a Paris city hall. That was followed by a full Catholic wedding ceremony at the Saint-Germain l'Auxerrois Church in Paris, France, on 7 July 2007. Fellow Frenchman, NBA player and future teammate, Boris Diaw was Parker's best man for the wedding.

In December 2007, tabloid websites and magazines published rumors that Parker had been having an extramarital affair with a model, Alexandra Paressant. Both Parker and Longoria vehemently denied these allegations through their spokespeople, saying "All high profile couples fall victim to these sorts of things in the course of their relationships. It appears that this is not the first time this woman has used an athlete to gain public notoriety." Parker initiated a $20 million lawsuit against the website that first reported the story, which later issued a full retraction and an apology, stating "X17online.com and X7 [sic], Inc. regret having been misled by Ms. Paressant and her representatives and apologize to Mr. Parker for any damage or inconvenience this may have caused him or his wife."

On 17 November 2010, Longoria filed for divorce in Los Angeles, citing "irreconcilable differences", and seeking spousal support from Parker. The couple had a prenuptial agreement that was signed in June 2007, the month before their wedding, and amended two years later in June 2009. Longoria believed that Parker had been cheating on her with another woman; Extra identified the other woman as Erin Barry, the wife of Brent Barry, Parker's former teammate, and revealed that the Barrys were also in the midst of a divorce. On 19 November 2010, Parker filed for divorce from Longoria in Bexar County, Texas on the grounds of "discord or conflict of personalities", thus establishing a legal battle over where the divorce case would be heard. Unlike Longoria's divorce petition, Parker's did not mention a prenuptial agreement and claimed that the parties "will enter into an agreement for the division of their estate". The divorce was finalized in Texas on 28 January 2011, the same day Longoria's lawyer filed papers to dismiss her Los Angeles petition.

Parker began dating French journalist Axelle Francine in 2011. In June 2013, it was reported that the couple was engaged. Parker and Axelle Francine married on 2 August 2014. They have two sons born in April 2014 and July 2016. The couple announced their separation in August 2020.

 Philanthropy 

During his playing career, Parker donated a block of 20 tickets for each home game to underprivileged youth. Parker is also the first ambassador for Make-A-Wish France. The Foundation is a non-profit organization that grants wishes to children with life-threatening medical conditions. On his personal website, Parker states: "I already knew Make-A-Wish as it is very famous around the world and I have previously taken part in the granting of wishes by meeting children and their families. I decided to commit to working with Make-A-Wish France when I understood the true dedication there and I realized that I could help to grant as many wishes as possible."

Tony Parker has also been known for participating to other former NBA pointguard Steve Nash foundation, and his ex-wife Eva Longoria's NGO Eva's Heroes.

 Music 

Parker is an avid enthusiast of hip-hop and rap music. He has released a French hip-hop album titled TP with producer Polygrafic (Sound Scientists). The album features collaborations with various artists including Booba, Don Choa, Eloquence, Eddie B, Jamie Foxx, K-Reen, Rickwel and Soprano. The singles taken from the album include:

 "Bienvenue dans le Texas", featuring French rapper Booba and released on 17 March 2007 and made available via iTunes. This initial release did not chart in France.
 "Balance-toi", which features Eva Longoria. It reached the number one position in the SNEP official French chart, staying there for one week. It also charted in the Belgian French (Wallonia) bubbling under Ultratip charts, reaching number 4.
 "Premier Love" (with Parker doing the French part and singer Rickwel the English part). The single made it to #11 in SNEP, the official French Singles Chart.

Other singles releases include:

 "Top of the Game", featuring American rapper Fabolous and French rapper Booba. It was released in March 2007. The accompanying video features Spurs teammate Tim Duncan, as well as former teammates Robert Horry, Brent Barry, and Nazr Mohammed.

 Albums

 Singles

*Did not appear in the official Belgian Ultratop 50 charts, but rather in the bubbling under Ultratip charts where it peaked at number 4. Fifty chart positions were added to the Ultratip peak to arrive at an equivalent Ultratop position

 Other interests 

Parker was also involved in the Paris bid for the 2012 Summer Olympics. His reaction to London's successful bid was: "I don't know what else we could have done. If we don't have it now, I guess we will never get it. The IOC seems to be very pro-Anglo-Saxon. I feel extremely gutted."

Parker has a well-known friendship with compatriot footballer Thierry Henry. The two were often seen together at some of Parker's NBA games. Parker was seen with his wife at Euro 2008 during one of France's matches.

In 2012, Parker and his brothers opened a nightclub, Nueve Lounge, in San Antonio. However, the business closed down within a year.

In December 2019, Parker bought a 3% stake in the Tacoma, Washington-based National Women's Soccer League team then known as Reign FC and now as OL Reign. He acquired this interest as part of a larger transaction in which OL Groupe, the parent company of prominent French football club Olympique Lyonnais, bought an 89.5% stake in the NWSL team.

 Nightclub injury 

Parker was injured on 14 June 2012 at the W.I.P nightclub in the SoHo district of New York City when a brawl broke out between entertainers Chris Brown and Drake. Parker filed a $20 million suit against the night club. Parker risked missing the 2012 Summer Olympics after a piece of glass thrown in the fight deeply penetrated his eye, requiring surgery to remove. However, on 6 July 2012, he was cleared to participate.

 Movies and television 

In 2008, Tony Parker co-directed with Jean-Marie Antonini a 1-hour film, 9 – Un chiffre, un homme (English: 9 – a number, a man). The biographical documentary film narrated by Benoît Allemane was produced by Parker. Celebrities featured included basketball players Kobe Bryant, Tim Duncan, Sean Elliott, Magic Johnson, Michael Jordan, Steve Nash, and David Robinson, as well as footballers Thierry Henry and Zinedine Zidane, judo player David Douillet, and musician and DJ Cut Killer, as well as Parker and Eva Longoria.

Parker also appeared in the 2008 French film Asterix at the Olympic Games as Tonus Parker, and he has been given token roles in various TV series like En aparté (2005), in addition to the French series On n'est pas couché (2011). He also played himself in the short film The Angels (2011), directed by Stéphane Marelli; and in a cameo appearance in season 4, episode 2 of the Netflix series Call My Agent (2020). He has participated in a number of episodes of Fort Boyard. He was the subject of the animated series Baskup - Tony Parker.

In 2021, Parker was the subject of the Netflix documentary Tony Parker: The Final Shot'' directed by Florent Bodin.

Advisory 

On 18 June 2019, it was reported that NorthRock Partners had hired Tony Parker to lead its sports, artists and entertainment division.

See also 

 List of National Basketball Association career games played leaders
 List of National Basketball Association career assists leaders
 List of National Basketball Association career turnovers leaders
 List of National Basketball Association career minutes played leaders
 List of National Basketball Association career playoff scoring leaders
 List of National Basketball Association career playoff assists leaders
 List of National Basketball Association career playoff turnovers leaders
 List of French NBA players
 List of sportspeople with dual nationality
 List of European basketball players in the United States

References

External links 

 
 
 FIBA Profile
 Tony Parker Player Profile (InterBasket)
 

1982 births
Living people
American men's basketball players
ASVEL Basket players
Basketball players at the 2012 Summer Olympics
Basketball players at the 2016 Summer Olympics
Basketball executives
Black French sportspeople
Centre Fédéral de Basket-ball players
Charlotte Hornets players
Euroscar award winners
French men's basketball players
French emigrants to the United States
French expatriate basketball people in the United States
French people of African-American descent
French people of Dutch descent
French Roman Catholics
Recipients of the Legion of Honour
National Basketball Association All-Stars
National Basketball Association players from France
National Basketball Association players with retired numbers
OL Reign owners
Chevaliers of the Légion d'honneur
Olympic basketball players of France
Paris Racing Basket players
Point guards
San Antonio Spurs draft picks
San Antonio Spurs players
Sportspeople from Bruges